Enoplomischus spinosus is a species of jumping spider.

Name
The specific name means "thorny" in Latin and refers to the process on the pedicel.

Distribution
Enoplomischus spinosus is only known from Kenya.

References
  (2005): A new species of Enoplomischus from Kenya (Araneae: Salticidae: Leptorchestinae). Genus 16(2): 307-311, 8 ff. PDF
  (2008): The world spider catalog, version 9.0. American Museum of Natural History.

Endemic fauna of Kenya
Salticidae
Arthropods of Kenya
Spiders of Africa
Spiders described in 2005
Taxa named by Wanda Wesołowska